Wulstan Bransford was a medieval Bishop of Worcester.

Bransford was first elected between 31 August and 8 September 1327 but the election was quashed. He was elected again about 4 January 1339 and consecrated on 21 March 1339. He tonsured the poet William de Rokayle, who was known as William Langland.

Bransford died on 6 August 1349.

Citations

References

 

Bishops of Worcester
Priors of Worcester
14th-century English Roman Catholic bishops
1349 deaths
Year of birth unknown